The Serra da Barbanza (Spanish: Sierra del Barbanza) is a mountain range in north-west Spain, extending in a south-westerly direction from Noia in Galicia.

Geography
The range forms the peninsula between the two rias of ría de Muros e Noia and ría de Arousa in the extreme west of Galicia.

Highest peaks in the range are Monte Iroite (685 m), Pico Murralla (658 m), Torre de Inxerto (654 m) and Monte Curota (618).

Flora and fauna
Common vegetation on the mountain range is genista and pines.

Wild horses are common. Other mammals include the Iberian wolf, fox and wild pig.

See also
 Barbanza

References 

Galician Massif
Mountain ranges of Galicia (Spain)